Futsal klub Dobovec or simply FK Dobovec  is a futsal club from Rogatec, Slovenia. They won the Slovenian Championship five times, most recently in 2022.

History 
The club was founded in April 1978 as KMN Dobovec, and played in amateur regional tournaments until 1995. In the 2000–01 season, the club was promoted to Slovenia's top division, the Slovenian Futsal League. In the 2014–15 season, Dobovec won their first national championship after defeating KMN Kobarid in the finals.

UEFA club competitions record 
All results list Dobovec's goal tally first.

Honours 
Slovenian Championship
 Winners (5): 2014–15, 2017–18, 2018–19, 2020–21, 2021–22

Slovenian Cup
 Winners (6): 2017–18, 2018–19, 2019–20, 2020–21, 2021–22, 2022–23

Slovenian Supercup
 Winners (2): 2015, 2018

References

External links
Official website 
UEFA profile

Futsal clubs established in 1978
Futsal clubs in Slovenia
1978 establishments in Slovenia